Taipei Bravo is a Taiwanese women's football club based in Taipei. Founded in 2017, it is associated with National Taiwan Normal University. The team currently competes in the country's top-tier women's domestic competition, the Taiwan Mulan Football League.

Name history 

 2017 – 2018 : Taipei PlayOne FC 
 2019 – : Taipei Bravo

Players

Current squad

Honours

References

External links

Association football clubs established in 2017
Women's football clubs in Taiwan
Sport in Taipei
2017 establishments in Taiwan
Taiwan Mulan Football League